Dozdan (also Romanized as Dozdān) is a village in Rizab Rural District, Qatruyeh District, Neyriz County, Fars Province, Iran. At the 2006 census, its population was 30, in 7 families.

References 

Populated places in Neyriz County